The Tofla virus is a strain of Hazara orthonairovirus in the genus Orthonairovirus belonging to the Crimean-Congo hemorrhagic fever serogroup. It was isolated from Ixodid in Japan in 2016.

References

Nairoviridae
Infraspecific virus taxa